Jacob Allison (born 16 April 1998) is a professional Australian rules footballer playing for the Brisbane Lions in the Australian Football League (AFL). 

Allison represented Queensland at the 2015 AFL Under 18 Championships and was one of just two Queenslanders named in the Under 18 All-Australian team.

He was drafted by Brisbane with pick 55, as an academy bidding selection, in the 2016 national draft.

References

External links

 

1998 births
Living people
Brisbane Lions players
Aspley Football Club players
Australian rules footballers from Queensland
People educated at Padua College (Brisbane)